W. G. Wilcox House is a historic multiple dwelling located at Plattsburgh in Clinton County, New York.  It was built about 1888 and is a two-story, rectangular multiple dwelling structure with a flat roof on a stone foundation.  It features elaborate Eastlake detailing.

It was listed on the National Register of Historic Places in 1982.

References

Residential buildings on the National Register of Historic Places in New York (state)
Queen Anne architecture in New York (state)
Houses completed in 1888
Houses in Clinton County, New York
National Register of Historic Places in Clinton County, New York